The German V1-class torpedo boats was a class of 26 large torpedo boats in service with the Imperial German Navy, Reichsmarine, Kriegsmarine and Royal Hellenic Navy in the early 20th century.

Design
In 1911, the Imperial German Navy placed orders for a flotilla of twelve torpedo boats as part of its shipbuilding programme for that year, with one half flotilla of six ordered from AG Vulcan, and six from Germaniawerft. The 1911 torpedo boats were smaller than those ordered in recent years in order to be more manoeuvrable and so work better with the fleet, which resulted in the numbering series for torpedo boats being restarted. The reduction in size resulted in the ships' seaworthiness being adversely affected, with the 1911 torpedo boats and the similar craft of the 1912 programme acquiring the disparaging nickname "Admiral Lans' cripples".

Armament consisted of two /30 naval guns in single mounts fore and aft, together with four 50 cm (19.7 in) torpedo tubes with one reload torpedo carried. Up to 18 mines could be carried. Crew was 74 officers and other ranks.

Ships

Imperial German Navy

1912 Program (VII Flotilla)
On completion, these vessels formed the VII Torpedo Boat Flotilla of the High Seas Fleet.

1912 Supplementary order
Replacements for the two vessels sold to Greece in 1912.

History 
The ships were ordered from Germany in 1912. The ships V1 through V4 served as V-class destroyers in the Imperial German Navy. The ships that served in the Greek Navy had been assigned German numbers V5 and V6, but were purchased before entering service in the German Navy, from the German shipyard Vulcan AG in Stettin, when the Balkan Wars were under-way (they were replaced in the German service with another V5 and V6). They were the first ships of the fleet that had steam turbines.

Later, during World War I, Greece belatedly entered the war on the side of the Triple Entente and, due to Greece's neutrality the two ex-German V-class ships were seized by the Allies in October 1916, taken over by the French in November and served in the French Navy from 1917–18. By 1918, they were back on escort duty under Greek colors, mainly in the Aegean Sea.

The two ships were stricken in 1919 and scrapped in 1922.

Notes

Citations

References

Destroyer classes